Clyde Neil Hill (5 December 1895 – 12 May 1965) was an Australian rules footballer who played with Carlton in the Victorian Football League (VFL).

References

External links 

Clyde Hill's profile at Blueseum

1895 births
Carlton Football Club players
Mooroopna Football Club players
Australian rules footballers from Victoria (Australia)
1965 deaths